HMS Linnet was one of three Royal Navy Linnet-class minelayers built in 1938.

References
 Jane's Fighting Ships 1939, p. 98

External links
 HMS Linnet (M 69) at uboat.net

Linnet-class minelayers
1938 ships
World War II minelayers of the United Kingdom